The Franklyn C. Shattuck House is located in Neenah, Wisconsin.

History
Franklyn C. Shattuck was a co-founder of Kimberly-Clark. The house was listed on the National Register of Historic Places in 1978 and on the State Register of Historic Places in 1989.

The Edward D. & Vina Shattuck Beals House, located in Neenah and having belonged to Shattuck's daughter, is also listed on both registers.

References

Houses on the National Register of Historic Places in Wisconsin
National Register of Historic Places in Winnebago County, Wisconsin
Houses in Winnebago County, Wisconsin
Colonial Revival architecture in Wisconsin
Brick buildings and structures
Limestone buildings in the United States
Houses completed in 1890